BZRK is a book series written by Michael Grant. The series consists of four books: BZRK, BZRK II: Reloaded, BZRK III: Apocalypse and BZRK: Origins (the prequel to the series). The series follows the interaction between two warring factions. On one side Charles and Benjamin Armstrong, owners of the Armstrong Fancy Gifts Corporation have a goal to turn the world into their version of utopia. The only people who can stop them are a group of teenagers with the codename BZRK. In 2011, Grant's BZRK had a multimedia online debut with gaming, apps and social media tie-ins beginning six months before the book's publication.

Books
 BZRK 	New York : Egmont USA, 2012. According to WorldCat, the book is held in 1121 libraries  
BZRK: Reloaded 	New York, NY : Egmont USA, 2013. According to WorldCat, the book is held in 741 libraries.
 BZRK: Apocalypse	London : Electric Monkey, 2014.  According to WorldCat, the book is held in 117 libraries   
BZRK: Origins New York : Egmont USA, [2013] According to WorldCat, the book is held in 33 libraries

References

Young adult novel series
Book series introduced in 2012
Dystopian novels
Novels by Michael Grant
American science fiction novels
American horror novels
Egmont Books books